Autosan Sp. z o.o. is a Polish bus and coach manufacturer. The company is located in Sanok, Poland. 
Its sales network includes European (also non-EU countries), African and Asian countries.
Currently it produces approximately 300 buses a year.

History
The company was founded in 1832 by Walenty Lipiński and Mateusz Beksiński as a boilermaker's plant. The history of the factory changed depending on domestic and European economic situations. At the beginning of its activity, the factory produced devices and equipment for the oil mining, distillery and brewing industries.
It later added transportation to its range and by 1894 it had become Poland's most important manufacturer of rail coaches and freight cars, tramcars and other high-capacity vehicles, while continuing to produce their initial output of boilers and other related devices. Later, even more variety of product was added, including cisterns, cranes, dredgers, road rollers, steel lifeboats, steel bridge constructions and casting articles.

In 1926, Autosan launched its first lot of buses mounted on Lancia chassis. Activities were interrupted during World War II but resumed in 1950. In 1973, a new family of buses is launched - the H9 bus, with the engine mounted at the rear. It would be followed in 1984 by the high-capacity H10 model.

In September 2013 the Court of Krosno declared the factory bankrupt. In a statement issued at the time it was explained that it was impossible to continue financing the restructuring. A few days later Sobiesław Zasada Group, which owned the company, sold a package of shares in Autosan to Gregory Tarnawa for one Polish zloty. Trade unionists from the factory picketed in front of the former owner, Sobiesław Zasada Group, in Kraków, demanding payment of arrears of salary for several months. The company is still operational.

Since 2001, the company has developed and produced components for rail vehicles, especially the bodies of railcars and trams.

Products

Buses

Current models
 Tourist coaches
 Autosan A0808T Gemini
 Autosan A1112T Ramzes
 Intercity buses 
 Autosan A0808T Gemini
 Autosan A0909L Tramp 2 (Autosan Scamp)
 Autosan A1010T Lider 3
 Autosan A1012T Lider
 Autosan Eurolider 9
 Autosan Eurolider 12 
 Autosan Eurolider 13
 Autosan Lider 9 eco
 Autosan Lider 9 eco2
 Autosan A8V Wetlina (Autosan Osprey)
 Local buses
 Autosan A1010T Lider 10
 Autosan H7-20MB Solina
 Autosan Sancity 9LE
 Autosan Eurolider 13LE
 Autosan Eurolider 15LE
 City buses (low-floor and low-entry buses)
 Sancity 9LE
 Sancity 10LF
 Sancity 12LE
 Sancity 12LF
 Sancity 18LF
 Autosan A8V Wetlina City (Autosan Osprey)
 School buses
 Autosan A0909S Smyk
 Autosan A1012T Eagle RHD
 Special buses, prison vans
 Autosan A1010T DW
 Autosan H7-10ZK
 Police buses for military squads
 Autosan H7-10I

Historical buses

 Tourist coaches
 Autosan A404T Cezar
 Autosan A1112T San
 Autosan A1112T Sanman
 Intercity buses
 Autosan H6-10 Melon
 Autosan A0909L Tramp
 Autosan H7-10 Traper
 Autosan H9-xx
 Autosan H10-xx
 Autosan A10-10T Lider Midi
 Local buses
 Autosan A0808MN Sancity
 Autosan H7-20 Trafic
 City buses
 Autosan H9-33
 Autosan H9-35
 Autosan A1010M Medium
 School buses
 Autosan H6-10.03S Żaczek
 Autosan H9-21 Kleks
 Autosan H10-10S Urwis
 Special buses, prison vans
 Autosan H6-56 Towos
 Autosan H6-10 SW

Others
Rail buses
Passenger trailers
Containers
Special coachworks
Components

See also 
 Jelcz SA

External links

 Company homepage
 Autosan Coach Sales (GB) homepage
 Homepage "Autosan Sverige"
 "Autosan Component Suppliers"
 Movie about Autosan

Bus manufacturers of Poland
Companies based in Sanok
Vehicle manufacturing companies established in 1832
Polish brands